Indonesia has more endemic birds than any other country. Indonesia's size, tropical climate, and archipelagic geography, support the world's second highest level of biodiversity (after Brazil).

Most endemic birds are in the Wallacea region of eastern Indonesia. Sulawesi supports twelve endemic bird genera. Of all Indonesian endemic birds, about sixty-one species are threatened: thirty-seven species are listed as vulnerable, twenty-three are endangered and eleven species are listed as critical on the IUCN Red List of Threatened Species.

Conservation status

Craciformes

Megapodiidae
 Aepypodius bruijnii (Bruijn's brush-turkey) - EN
 Talegalla cuvieri (red-billed brush-turkey) - LC
 Macrocephalon maleo (maleo) - EN
 Eulipoa wallacei (Moluccan scrubfowl) - VU
 Megapodius bernsteinii (Sula scrubfowl) - NT
 Megapodius tenimberensis (Tanimbar scrubfowl) - NE
 Megapodius geelvinkianus (Biak scrubfowl) - VU

Galliformes

Phasianidae
 Anurophasis monorthonyx (Snow Mountain quail) - NT
 Arborophila orientalis (white-faced hill-partridge) - VU
 Arborophila javanica (chestnut-bellied partridge) - LC
 Arborophila rubrirostris (red-billed partridge) - LC
 Gallus varius (green junglefowl) - LC
 Lophura hoogerwerfi (Hoogerwerf's pheasant) - VU
 Lophura inornata (Salvadori's pheasant) - VU
 Polyplectron chalcurum (bronze-tailed peacock-pheasant) - LC

Falconiformes

Falconidae
 Falco moluccensis (spotted kestrel) - LC

Accipitridae
 Spilornis rufipectus (Sulawesi serpent eagle) - LC
 Accipiter griseiceps (Sulawesi goshawk) - LC
 Accipiter trinotatus (spot-tailed goshawk) - LC
 Accipiter henicogrammus (Moluccan goshawk) - LC
 Accipiter nanus (small sparrowhawk) - NT
 Accipiter erythrauchen (rufous-necked sparrowhawk) - LC
 Accipiter rhodogaster (vinous-breasted sparrowhawk) - LC
 Nisaetus floris (Flores hawk-eagle) - EN
 Nisaetus bartelsi (Javan hawk-eagle) - EN
 Nisaetus lanceolatus (Sulawesi hawk-eagle) - LC

Gruiformes

Rallidae
 Rallina leucospila (white-striped forest-rail) - NT
 Gallirallus sharpei (Sharpe's rail) - DD
 Gallirallus wallacii (invisible rail) - VU
 Aramidopsis plateni (snoring rail) - VU
 Gymnocrex rosenbergii (blue-faced rail) - VU
 Gymnocrex talaudensis (Talaud rail) - EN
 Amaurornis isabellinus (isabelline waterhen) - LC
 Amaurornis magnirostris (Talaud bush-hen) - NE

Turniciformes

Turnicidae
 Turnix everetti (Sumba buttonquail) - VU

Charadriiformes

Charadriidae
 Vanellus macropterus (Javanese lapwing) - CR
 Charadrius javanicus (Javan plover) - NT

Scolopacidae
 Scolopax saturata (Javan woodcock) - NT
 Scolopax celebensis (Sulawesi woodcock) - NT
 Scolopax rochussenii (Moluccan woodcock) - EN

Columbiformes

Columbidae
 Turacoena manadensis (white-faced cuckoo-dove) - LC
 Geopelia maugeus (barred dove) - LC
 Gallicolumba tristigmata (Sulawesi ground dove) - LC
 Goura cristata (western crowned-pigeon) - VU
 Treron griseicauda (grey-cheeked green pigeon) - LC
 Treron floris (Flores green pigeon) - VU
 Treron teysmannii (Sumba green pigeon) - NT
 Treron oxyurus (Sumatran green pigeon) - NT
 Ptilinopus porphyreus (pink-headed fruit-dove) - LC
 Ptilinopus dohertyi (red-naped fruit-dove) - VU
 Ptilinopus fischeri (red-eared fruit-dove) - LC
 Ptilinopus subgularis (maroon-chinned fruit-dove) - NT
 Ptilinopus bernsteinii (scarlet-breasted fruit-dove) - LC
 Ptilinopus wallacii (Wallace's fruit-dove) - LC
 Ptilinopus monacha (blue-capped fruit-dove) - NT
 Ptilinopus hyogastrus (grey-headed fruit-dove) - LC
 Ptilinopus granulifrons (carunculated fruit-dove) - VU
 Ducula concinna (elegant imperial pigeon) - LC
 Ducula forsteni (white-bellied imperial pigeon) - LC
 Ducula radiata (grey-headed imperial pigeon) - LC
 Ducula perspicillata (spectacled imperial pigeon) - LC
 Ducula myristicivora (spice imperial pigeon) - LC
 Ducula basilica (cinnamon-bellied imperial pigeon) - LC
 Ducula lacernulata (dark-backed imperial pigeon) - LC
 Ducula luctuosa (silver-tipped imperial pigeon) - LC
 Cryptophaps poecilorrhoa (sombre pigeon) - LC
 Gymnophaps mada (Buru mountain pigeon) - LC

Psittaciformes

Psittacidae
 Loriculus stigmatus (Sulawesi hanging-parrot) - LC
 Loriculus amabilis (Moluccan hanging-parrot) - LC
 Loriculus sclateri (Sula hanging-parrot) - LC
 Loriculus catamene (Sangihe hanging-parrot) - EN
 Loriculus exilis (red-billed hanging-parrot) - NT
 Loriculus pusillus (yellow-throated hanging-parrot) - NT
 Loriculus flosculus (Flores hanging-parrot) - EN
 Micropsitta geelvinkiana (Geelvink pygmy-parrot) - NT
 Cacatua moluccensis (salmon-crested cockatoo) - VU
 Cacatua alba (white cockatoo) - VU
 Cacatua goffiniana (Tanimbar cockatoo) - NT
 Chalcopsitta atra (black lory) - LC
 Eos histrio (red-and-blue lory) - EN
 Eos squamata (violet-necked lory) - LC
 Eos bornea (red lory) - LC
 Eos reticulata (blue-streaked lory) - NT
 Eos cyanogenia (black-winged lory) - VU
 Eos semilarvata (blue-eared lory) - LC
 Trichoglossus ornatus (ornate lorikeet) - LC
 Saudareos meyeri (yellow-cheeked lorikeet) - LC
 Saudareos flavoviridis (Sula lorikeet) - LC
 Lorius garrulus (chattering lory) - EN
 Lorius domicella (purple-naped lory) - VU
 Charmosynopsis toxopei (blue-fronted lorikeet) - CR
 Prioniturus flavicans (yellowish-breasted racquet-tail) - NT
 Prioniturus platurus (golden-mantled racquet-tail) - LC
 Prioniturus mada (Buru racquet-tail) - LC
 Tanygnathus gramineus (black-lored parrot) - VU
 Tanygnathus megalorynchos (great-billed parrot ) - LC
 Alisterus amboinensis (Moluccan king-parrot) - LC
 Psittaculirostris salvadorii (Salvadori's fig-parrot) - VU

Cuculiformes

Cuculidae
 Cuculus crassirostris (Sulawesi hawk-cuckoo) - LC
 Cacomantis aeruginosus (Moluccan cuckoo) - NT
 Chrysococcyx crassirostris (pied bronze-cuckoo) - LC
 Eudynamys melanorhynchus (black-billed koel) - LC
 Phaenicophaeus calyorhynchus (yellow-billed malkoha) - LC
 Carpococcyx viridis (Sumatran ground cuckoo) - CR
 Centropus goliath (Goliath coucal) - LC
 Centropus spilopterus (Kai coucal) - LC
 Centropus chalybeus (Biak coucal) - NT
 Centropus nigrorufus (Sunda coucal) - VU
 Centropus celebensis (bay coucal) - LC

Strigiformes

Tytonidae
 Tyto inexspectata (Sulawesi golden owl) - VU
 Tyto almae (Seram masked owl) - NE
 Tyto nigrobrunnea (Taliabu masked owl) - EN
 Tyto sororcula (Moluccan masked owl) - DD
 Tyto rosenbergii (Sulawesi owl) - LC

Strigidae
 Otus umbra (Simeulue scops-owl) - NT
 Otus angelinae (Javan scops-owl) - VU
 Otus manadensis (Sulawesi scops-owl) - LC
 Otus collari (Sangihe scops-owl) - LC
 Otus alfredi (Flores scops-owl) - EN
 Otus siaoensis (Siau scops-owl) - CR
 Otus enganensis (Enggano scops-owl) - NT
 Otus beccarii (Biak scops-owl) - EN
 Otus mentawi (Mentawai scops-owl) - NT
 Otus silvicola (Wallace's scops-owl) - LC
 Glaucidium castanopterum (Javan owlet) - LC
 Ninox rudolfi (Sumba boobook) - NT
 Ninox sumbaensis (least boobook) - NT
 Ninox ios (cinnabar boobook) - VU
 Ninox ochracea (ochre-bellied boobook) - NT
 Ninox burhani (Togian boobook) - NE
 Ninox punctulata (speckled boobook) - LC

Caprimulgiformes

Caprimulgidae
 Eurostopodus diabolicus (Sulawesi eared nightjar) - VU
 Caprimulgus celebensis (Sulawesi nightjar) - LC
 Caprimulgus meesi (Mees's nightjar ) - LC
 Caprimulgus pulchellus (Salvadori's nightjar) - NT

Aegothelidae
 Aegotheles crinifrons (long-whiskered owlet-nightjar) - LC
 Aegotheles affinis (Vogelkop owlet-nightjar) - DD

Apodiformes

Apodidae
 Collocalia infuscata (Moluccan swiftlet) - LC
 Collocalia vulcanorum (volcano swiftlet) - NT

Trogoniformes

Trogonidae
 Apalharpactes reinwardtii (Javan trogon) - EN
 Apalharpactes mackloti (Sumatran trogon) - LC

Coraciiformes

Coraciidae
 Coracias temminckii (purple-winged roller) - LC
 Eurystomus azureus (purple dollarbird) - VU

Alcedinidae
 Actenoides monachus (green-backed kingfisher) - NT
 Actenoides princeps (scaly kingfisher) - LC
 Tanysiptera ellioti (Kofiau paradise-kingfisher) - DD
 Tanysiptera riedelii (Biak paradise-kingfisher) - NT
 Tanysiptera carolinae (Numfor paradise-kingfisher) - NT
 Cittura cyanotis (lilac-cheeked kingfisher) - NT
 Caridonax fulgidus (white-rumped kingfisher) - LC
 Pelargopsis melanorhyncha (black-billed kingfisher) - LC
 Halcyon cyanoventris (Javan kingfisher) - LC
 Todirhamphus diops (blue-and-white kingfisher) - LC
 Todirhamphus lazuli (lazuli kingfisher) - NT
 Todirhamphus funebris (sombre kingfisher) - VU
 Todirhamphus enigma (Talaud kingfisher) - NT
 Ceyx fallax (Sulawesi kingfisher) - NT
 Alcedo coerulescens (small blue kingfisher) - LC
 Actenoides capucinus (black-headed kingfisher) - CR

Meropidae
 Meropogon forsteni (purple-bearded bee-eater) - LC

Bucerotiformes

Bucerotidae
 Penelopides exarhatus (Sulawesi hornbill) - LC
 Aceros cassidix (knobbed hornbill) - LC
 Aceros everetti (Sumba hornbill) - VU

Piciformes

Ramphastidae
 Megalaima corvina (brown-throated barbet) - LC
 Megalaima javensis (black-banded barbet) - NT
 Megalaima armillaris (flame-fronted barbet) - LC

Picidae
 Dendrocopos temminckii (Sulawesi pygmy woodpecker) - LC
 Mulleripicus fulvus (ashy woodpecker) - LC

Passeriformes

Pittidae
 Pitta schneideri (Schneider's pitta) - VU
 Pitta maxima (ivory-breasted pitta) - LC
 Pitta dohertyi (Sula pitta) - NT
 Pitta venusta (graceful pitta) - VU
 Pitta elegans (elegant pitta) - LC

Ptilonorhynchidae
 Amblyornis inornata (Vogelkop bowerbird) - LC
 Amblyornis flavifrons (golden-fronted bowerbird) - LC

Meliphagidae
 Oreornis chrysogenys (orange-cheeked honeyeater) - LC
 Melitograis gilolensis (white-streaked friarbird) - LC
 Philemon brassi (Brass's friarbird) - NT
 Philemon fuscicapillus (dusky friarbird) - VU
 Philemon moluccensis (black-faced friarbird) - LC
 Philemon subcorniculatus (grey-necked friarbird) - LC
 Melipotes gymnops (Arfak honeyeater) - LC
 Melidectes leucostephes (Vogelkop melidectes) - LC
 Ptiloprora erythropleura (rufous-sided honeyeater) - LC
 Myza celebensis (dark-eared myza) - LC
 Myza sarasinorum (white-eared myza) - LC
 Lichmera lombokia (scaly-crowned honeyeater) - LC
 Lichmera argentauris (olive honeyeater) - LC
 Lichmera limbata (Indonesian honeyeater) - LC
 Lichmera squamata (white-tufted honeyeater) - LC
 Lichmera deningeri (Buru honeyeater) - LC
 Lichmera monticola (Seram honeyeater) - LC
 Lichmera notabilis (black-chested honeyeater) - LC
 Myzomela blasii (drab myzomela) - LC
 Myzomela kuehni (Wetar myzomela) - NT
 Myzomela dammermani (Sumba myzomela) - LC
 Myzomela chloroptera (Sulawesi myzomela) - LC
 Myzomela wakoloensis (Wakolo myzomela) - LC
 Myzomela boiei (Banda myzomela) - LC

Acanthizidae
 Sericornis rufescens (Vogelkop scrubwren) - LC
 Gerygone hypoxantha (Biak gerygone) - EN
 Gerygone dorsalis (rufous-sided gerygone) - LC

Artamidae
 Artamus monachus (ivory-backed woodswallow) - LC

Campephagidae
 Coracina schistacea (slaty cuckooshrike) - LC
 Coracina personata (Wallacean cuckooshrike) - LC
 Coracina atriceps (Moluccan cuckooshrike) - LC
 Coracina fortis (Buru cuckooshrike) - NT
 Coracina temminckii (cerulean cuckooshrike) - LC
 Coracina bicolor (pied cuckooshrike) - NT
 Coracina leucopygia (white-rumped cuckooshrike) - LC
 Coracina parvula (Halmahera cuckooshrike) - LC
 Coracina abbotti (pygmy cuckooshrike) - LC
 Coracina dohertyi (Sumba cicadabird) - LC
 Coracina sula (Sula cicadabird) - LC
 Coracina dispar (Kai cicadabird) - NT
 Coracina morio (Sulawesi cicadabird) - LC
 Coracina ceramensis (pale cicadabird) - LC
 Lalage leucopygialis (white-rumped triller) - LC
 Lalage sueurii (white-shouldered triller) - LC
 Lalage aurea (rufous-bellied triller) - LC
 Lalage moesta (white-browed triller) - LC
 Pericrocotus lansbergei (Flores minivet) - LC
 Pericrocotus miniatus (Sunda minivet) - LC

Pachycephalidae
 Hylocitrea bonensis (olive-flanked whistler) - LC
 Coracornis raveni (maroon-backed whistler) - LC
 Coracornis sanghirensis (Sangihe shrikethrush) - CR
 Pachycephala phaionota (island whistler) - LC
 Pachycephala sulfuriventer (sulphur-bellied whistler) - LC
 Pachycephala meyeri (Vogelkop whistler) - LC
 Pachycephala nudigula (bare-throated whistler) - LC
 Pachycephala mentalis (black-chinned whistler) - NE
 Pachycephala fulvotincta (rusty-breasted whistler) - NE
 Pachycephala griseonota (drab whistler) - LC
 Pachycephala arctitorquis (Wallacean whistler) - LC

Oriolidae
 Sphecotheres hypoleucus (Wetar figbird) - NT
 Oriolus bouroensis (black-eared oriole) - LC
 Oriolus forsteni (grey-collared oriole) - LC
 Oriolus phaeochromus (dusky-brown oriole) - LC
 Pitohui cerviniventris (Raja Ampat pitohui) - LC

Dicruridae
 Dicrurus sumatranus (Sumatran drongo) - NT
 Dicrurus montanus (Sulawesi drongo) - LC
 Dicrurus densus (Wallacean drongo) - LC

Rhipiduridae
 Eutrichomyias rowleyi (cerulean flycatcher) - CR
 Rhipidura phoenicura (rufous-tailed fantail) - LC
 Rhipidura euryura (white-bellied fantail) - LC
 Rhipidura diluta (brown-capped fantail) - LC
 Rhipidura fuscorufa (cinnamon-tailed fantail) - NT
 Rhipidura teysmanni (Sulawesi fantail) - LC
 Rhipidura sulaensis (Taliabu fantail)
 Rhipidura superflua (tawny-backed fantail) - LC
 Rhipidura dedemi (streaky-breasted fantail) - LC
 Rhipidura opistherythra (long-tailed fantail) - NT

Monarchidae
 Monarcha pileatus (white-naped monarch) - LC
 Monarcha castus (Loetoe monarch) - LC
 Monarcha mundus (black-bibbed monarch) - LC
 Monarcha sacerdotum (Flores monarch) - EN
 Monarcha everetti (white-tipped monarch) - EN
 Monarcha loricatus (black-tipped monarch) - LC
 Monarcha boanensis (black-chinned monarch) - CR
 Monarcha leucurus (white-tailed monarch) - NT
 Monarcha julianae (black-backed monarch) - DD
 Monarcha brehmii (Biak monarch) - EN
 Myiagra atra (Biak flycatcher) - NT
 Myiagra galeata (dark-grey flycatcher) - LC

Corvidae
 Corvus typicus (piping crow) - LC
 Corvus unicolor (Banggai crow) - CR
 Corvus florensis (Flores crow) - EN
 Corvus validus (long-billed crow) - LC
 Corvus fuscicapillus (brown-headed crow) - NT

Paradisaeidae
 Lycocorax pyrrhopterus (Halmahera paradise-crow) - LC
 Lycocorax obiensis (Obi paradise-crow) - LC
 Paradigalla carunculata (long-tailed paradigalla) - NT
 Astrapia nigra (Arfak astrapia) - LC
Parotia berlepschi (bronze parotia) - LC
 Parotia sefilata (western parotia) - LC
 Cicinnurus respublica (Wilson's bird-of-paradise) - NT
 Semioptera wallacii (Wallace's standardwing) - LC
 Paradisaea rubra (red bird-of-paradise) - NT
Lophorina niedda (Vogelkop superb bird-of-paradise)

Petroicidae
 Peneothello cryptoleuca (smoky robin) - LC
 Microeca hemixantha (golden-bellied flyrobin) - NT
 Petroica archboldi (Snow Mountain robin) - DD

Aegithalidae
 Psaltria exilis (pygmy tit) - LC

Cisticolidae
 Prinia familiaris (bar-winged prinia) - LC

Pycnonotidae
 Pycnonotus leucogrammicus (cream-striped bulbul) - LC
 Pycnonotus tympanistrigus (spot-necked bulbul) - NT
 Pycnonotus bimaculatus (orange-spotted bulbul) - LC
 Pycnonotus snouckaerti (Aceh bulbul) - NR
 Alophoixus affinis (Seram golden bulbul) - LC
 Hypsipetes virescens (green-winged bulbul) - LC

Cettiidae
 Tesia superciliaris (Javan tesia) - LC
 Tesia everetti (russet-capped tesia) - LC
 Cettia carolinae (Tanimbar bush warbler) - NT

Locustellidae
 Locustella montis (Javan bush warbler) - LC

Phylloscopidae
 Phylloscopus sarasinorum (Sulawesi leaf warbler) - LC
 Phylloscopus grammiceps (Sunda warbler) - LC

Leiothrichidae
 Garrulax rufifrons (rufous-fronted laughingthrush) - NT
 Crocias albonotatus (spotted crocias) - NT

Pellorneidae
 Trichastoma celebense (Sulawesi babbler) - LC
 Trichastoma buettikoferi (Sumatran babbler) - NT
 Malacocincla perspicillata (black-browed babbler) - VU
 Napothera rufipectus (rusty-breasted wren-babbler) - LC
 Alcippe pyrrhoptera (Javan fulvetta) - LC

Timaliidae
 Stachyris grammiceps (white-breasted babbler) - NT
 Stachyris thoracica (white-bibbed babbler) - LC
 Stachyris melanothorax (crescent-chested babbler) - LC
 Macronous flavicollis (grey-cheeked tit-babbler) - LC
 Malia grata (malia) - LC

Zosteropidae
 Zosterops salvadorii (Enggano white-eye) - LC
 Zosterops chloris (lemon-bellied white-eye) - LC
 Zosterops grayi (pearl-bellied white-eye) - NT
 Zosterops uropygialis (golden-bellied white-eye) - NT
 Zosterops consobrinorum (pale-bellied white-eye) - LC
 Zosterops anomalus (lemon-throated white-eye) - LC
 Zosterops wallacei (yellow-spectacled white-eye) - LC
 Zosterops atrifrons (black-crowned white-eye) - LC
 Zosterops nehrkorni (Sangihe white-eye) - CR
 Zosterops stalkeri (Seram white-eye) - NE
 Zosterops atriceps (creamy-throated white-eye) - LC
 Zosterops mysorensis (Biak white-eye) - NT
 Zosterops buruensis (Buru yellow white-eye) - LC
 Zosterops kuehni (Ambon yellow white-eye) - NT
 Tephrozosterops stalkeri (bicoloured white-eye) - LC
 Madanga ruficollis (rufous-throated white-eye) - EN
 Lophozosterops javanicus (Javan grey-throated white-eye) - LC
 Lophozosterops squamiceps (streaky-headed white-eye) - LC
 Lophozosterops superciliaris (yellow-browed white-eye) - LC
 Lophozosterops pinaiae (grey-hooded white-eye) - LC
 Lophozosterops dohertyi (crested white-eye) - LC
 Heleia crassirostris (thick-billed white-eye) - LC

Sturnidae
 Aplonis crassa (Tanimbar starling) - NT
 Aplonis mysolensis (Moluccan starling) - LC
 Aplonis magna (long-tailed starling) - LC
 Basilornis celebensis (Sulawesi myna) - LC
 Basilornis galeatus (helmeted myna) - NT
 Basilornis corythaix (long-crested myna) - LC
 Streptocitta albicollis (white-necked myna) - LC
 Streptocitta albertinae (bare-eyed myna) - NT
 Enodes erythrophris (fiery-browed myna) - LC
 Scissirostrum dubium (finch-billed myna) - LC
 Leucopsar rothschildi (Bali starling) - CR
 Sturnus melanopterus (black-winged starling) - EN

Turdidae
 Myophonus melanurus (shiny whistling-thrush) - LC
 Myophonus glaucinus (Javan whistling-thrush) - LC
 Myophonus castaneus (chestnut-winged whistling-thrush) - NE
 Zoothera heinrichi (geomalia) - NT
 Zoothera schistacea (slaty-backed thrush) - NT
 Zoothera dumasi (Buru thrush) - NT
 Zoothera joiceyi (Seram thrush) - NT
 Zoothera leucolaema (Enggano thrush) - NT
 Zoothera erythronota (red-backed thrush) - NT
 Zoothera mendeni (red-and-black thrush) - NT
 Zoothera machiki (fawn-breasted thrush) - NT
 Cataponera turdoides (Sulawesi thrush) - LC
 Cochoa beccarii (Sumatran cochoa) - VU
 Cochoa azurea (Javan cochoa) - VU
 Heinrichia calligyna (great shortwing) - LC

Muscicapidae
 Cinclidium diana (Sunda robin) - LC
 Enicurus velatus (Sunda forktail) - LC
 Eumyias additus (Buru jungle flycatcher) - NT
 Muscicapa segregata (Sumba brown flycatcher) - NT
 Ficedula rufigula (rufous-throated flycatcher) - NT
 Ficedula buruensis (cinnamon-chested flycatcher) - LC
 Ficedula henrici (Damar flycatcher) - VU
 Ficedula harterti (Sumba flycatcher) - LC
 Ficedula bonthaina (Lompobattang flycatcher) - EN
 Cyornis sanfordi (Matinan flycatcher) - EN
 Cyornis hoevelli (blue-fronted flycatcher) - LC
 Cyornis ruckii (Rueck's blue-flycatcher) - CR
 Cyornis omissus (Sulawesi blue-flycatcher) - LC
 Cyornis oscillans (Flores jungle flycatcher) - LC
 Cyornis stresemanni (Sumba jungle flycatcher) - LC
 Cyornis colonus (Sula jungle flycatcher) - NT
 Cyornis pelingensis (Banggai jungle flycatcher)

Chloropseidae
 Chloropsis media (Sumatran leafbird) - LC
 Chloropsis venusta (blue-masked leafbird) - NT

Dicaeidae
 Dicaeum annae (golden-rumped flowerpecker) - LC
 Dicaeum aureolimbatum (yellow-sided flowerpecker) - LC
 Dicaeum nehrkorni (crimson-crowned flowerpecker) - LC
 Dicaeum erythrothorax (flame-breasted flowerpecker) - LC
 Dicaeum vulneratum (ashy flowerpecker) - LC
 Dicaeum igniferum (black-fronted flowerpecker) - LC
 Dicaeum celebicum (grey-sided flowerpecker) - LC
 Dicaeum sanguinolentum (blood-breasted flowerpecker) - LC
 Dicaeum trochileum (scarlet-headed flowerpecker) - LC

Nectariniidae
 Nectarinia buettikoferi (apricot-breasted sunbird) - LC
 Aethopyga duyvenbodei (elegant sunbird) - EN
 Aethopyga eximia (white-flanked sunbird) - LC
 Aethopyga mystacalis (Javan sunbird) - LC

Estrildidae
 Lonchura molucca (black-faced munia) - LC
 Lonchura ferruginosa (white-capped munia) - LC
 Lonchura quinticolor (five-colored munia) - LC
 Lonchura pallida (pale-headed munia) - LC
 Lonchura vana (grey-banded munia) - VU
 Lonchura montana (Snow Mountain munia) - LC
 Lonchura teerinki (black-breasted munia) - LC
 Padda oryzivora (Java sparrow) - VU

See also 
 Fauna of Indonesia
 Fauna of New Guinea
 Lists of birds by region
 List of birds of Indonesia

Notes

References
 Birdlife International, The World List of Threatened Birds, 
 Birdlife International, Endemic Bird Areas of the World, 
 Morten Strange, A Photographic Guide to the Birds of Indonesia, 
 Periplus Action Guides, Birding Indonesia, 
 The Howard and Moore, Complete Checklist of the Birds of the World,

External links 
 BirdLife International
 IUCN Red List searchpage

'endemic
'birds
Birds, endemic
Indonesia